Martin-Roch-Xavier Estève (21 July 1772 - 1 March 1853) was Napoleon’s Treasurer General under the First Empire.

Biography

Early life 
Estève was born on 21 July 1772 in Montpellier. He was the son of François Estève and Elisabeth-Louise Beraud.

Career under Napoleon 
Engaged in 1792, Estève began in the services of the "army payroll."

Napoleon had known Estève in Italy in 1796 and appreciated his qualities. Estève followed the First Consul in the campaigns in Italy and Egypt, and was distinguished in his fidelity and his ability in carrying out jobs that were entrusted to him. He was appointed Deputy Paymaster General to the Treasury of the Army of Italy. Later, he was appointed Paymaster General of the Army of the East. He spent three years as "director general-accountant of public revenues of Egypt." In a country where resources were meager, Estève's administrative qualities excelled. He managed the finances of the new colony and reformed the tax system. His mission was essential, as it was necessary for the French to live of their conquest due to their naval disaster at the Battle of the Nile which led to them being cut off from France.

After he returned to France, he was attached to the household of Napoleon, where he brought in a clerk and his future successor, Guillaume Peyrusse, whose rise he promoted. He resided in this capacity in the Imperial Palace of Tuileries. He managed the affairs of the house of Napoleon and Napoleon then made him treasurer of his house. He was appointed treasurer of the government in 1801 and Treasurer General of the Crown in 1804. The Treasurer General, an officer of the house, was the principal administrator of the funds in paid by the State under the civil list. He was charged after the Battle of Jena in 1806 with managing the Prussian finances as "Administrator general of the finances and domains of the conquered countries beyond the Elbe." He was made Count of the Empire on 24 February 1809.

Nicolas François, Count Mollien, wrote in his memoirs that "Estève had perfectly justified this confidence by his probity." However, symptoms of serious alterations in his health after several years as treasurer, had begun to worry Napoleon. Napoleon thought he could not keep a diminished man in service. After a dispute with the Emperor, Estève resigned and in December 1811, he handed over his position as Treasurer General of the Crown to Baron de La Bouillerie, who contrary to what his successor did, handed over part of the treasure to the Count of Artois.

Family and descendants 
He married Anne-Antoinette-Françoise Villeminot (17 April 1784 - 11 February 1865) on 5 October 1802 in the Saint-Thomas d'Aquin church in Paris, daughter of the banker César-Louis-Marie Villeminot (1749-1807). From this union, four children were born:
 Napoleon-César-Xavier Count Estève (3 November 1802 - 26 March 1864), General Councilor of Eure, married to Virginie Morin-Blotais. They had 6 children:
 Paul-Louis-Xavier Count Estève, married to Angèle-Antoinette Bayet on 3 October 1860. They had no children.
 Henri Count Estève (7 July 1844 - 27 September 1911), married to Blanche Babled. They had two children:
 Jean-Joseph Estève, had children including:
 Xavier-Jean-Marie Estève, married to Marie Louise De Volder. They had children including:
 Yves Estève (born 10 May 1943), married to Béatrix d'Andigne (8 March 1946 - 22 March 2020) in 1969. Yves Estève served as Mayor of Heudicourt and is the current Count. Estève has five children:
 Eric
 Florence
 Laetitia
 Veronique
 Phillipe
 Anne-Marie Estève, married to Charles de Hedouville on 12 December 1893
Valerie-Louise-Edwige Estève (1840 - 1 March 1855)
Marie-Eugenie-Pauline Estève, married to Gaston Gabriel Duval de Leseaude on 12 March 1874.
Mathilde-Virginie-Pauline, married to Claude-Louis-Marie-Alfred de Monti de Reze in November 1869
Urbaine-Pauline-Agathe, married to Bernard-Paul-Jean de Monti de Reze in November 1871
 Louis-Edouard-Roch Estève (21 June 1803 - 7 April 1894), auditor at the Council of State, 2nd class ordinary service (12 December 1832) to the War and Navy Committee.
 Eugène-Martin-François Estève (born 26 March 1807, Tuileries Palace, Paris, died in China on 1 July 1848), missionary priest of the Society of Jesus in the diocese of Nankin.
 Guillaum Jean-Paul Estève

Later life and death 

In 1804, he bought the Château d'Heudicourt from four Parisian nobles and then undertook several renovations. He restored the castle under the moat and entrance bridge, and the side wings that were ruined. He added a classical stone building Façade in the centre of the Chateau. After his resignation as treasurer, Estève retired in Heudicourt to his Chateau. Estève died there on 1 March 1853, aged 80. The Chateau is still owned by the Estève family.

Offices 
 Paymaster general of the Army of the Orient 
 Treasurer General of the Crown
 Administrator-general of finances and domains of the countries conquered beyond the Elbe in 1806.

Publications 
 " Memory on the finances of Egypt, from its conquest by Sultan Sélym I , to that of the general-in-chief Bonaparte", Description de l'Egypte, State modern, Paris, Imperial Printing, 1809, p 299 -398. Count Estève had 60 copies of this work printed.

Titles 
 Count of the Empire 24 February 1809.

Honours 
 Officer of the Legion of Honour
 Treasurer of the first Cohort of the Legion of Honour.

Tributes, honours and mentions

External links 
 Leonore Base
 Martin-Roch-Xavier Estève on www.1789-1815.com

Bibliography 
 The imperial Almanac for the year 1810
 The Correspondent

Notes

References 

Counts of the First French Empire
People of the First French Empire
1772 births
1853 deaths